Hans Evert Nilsson (born 5 September 1946) is a Swedish sprint canoer who competed in the late 1960s and early 1970s. He won a bronze medal in the K-4 10000 m event at the 1970 ICF Canoe Sprint World Championships in Copenhagen.

Nilsson also competed in two Summer Olympics, earning his best finish of fourth in the K-4 1000 m event in 1968.

References

External links

1946 births
Canoeists at the 1968 Summer Olympics
Canoeists at the 1972 Summer Olympics
Living people
Olympic canoeists of Sweden
Swedish male canoeists
ICF Canoe Sprint World Championships medalists in kayak